Angela J. Davis, professor of law at the American University's Washington College of Law, is an expert in criminal law and procedure with a specific focus on prosecutorial power and racism in the criminal justice system. She is the author of Arbitrary Justice: The Power of the American Prosecutor, published in 2009.

References

External links

American women academics
Living people
Year of birth missing (living people)
Washington College of Law faculty
American writers
American women legal scholars
American legal scholars
21st-century American women